This is a list of albums by musician Talal Maddah. Note that before he joined Fonoun Al-Jazeerah Records, Talal didn't put numbers on his albums and there are many albums that were released even before there were labeled records.

References

Saudi Arabian musicians